Water scarcity in Iran is caused by high climatic variability, poor distribution of water, and prioritization of economic development. Water scarcity in Iran is further exacerbated by climate change.

Water scarcity can be a result of two mechanisms: physical (absolute) water scarcity and economic water scarcity, where physical water scarcity is a result of inadequate natural water resources to supply a region's demand, and economic water scarcity is a result of poor management of the sufficient available water resources.

Rainfall is highly seasonal, which led to the government building dams to ensure a more consistent water supply. Despite this, water availability has declined since the 20th century whilst demand has increased. By the 2010s, authorities and the United Nations were describing it as a crisis and it contributed to protests in the country.

Background

Climate 

Rainfall in Iran is highly seasonal with a rainy season between October and March that leaves the land extremely dry for the remainder of the year. Immense seasonal variations in flow characterize Iran's rivers. For example, the Karun River in Khuzestan carries water during periods of maximum flow that is ten times the amount borne in dry periods. In numerous localities, there may be no precipitation until sudden storms, accompanied by heavy rains, dump almost the entire year's rainfall in a few days. Water shortages are compounded by the unequal distribution of water. Near the Caspian Sea, rainfall averages about 1,280 mm per year, but in the Central Plateau and in the lowlands to the south it seldom exceeds 100 mm. Iran's susceptibility to high variation in temperature and precipitation has led to the creation of dams and reservoirs to regulate and create a more stable water flow throughout the country.

Climate change 

Iran is expected to have a mean temperature increase of 2.6 °C and a 35% decrease in precipitation within the next few decades. This could potentially exacerbate current drought and crop production issues.

Water resources

Water availability
Internal renewable water resources are estimated at 128.5 billion cubic meters (BCM)/year (average for 1977–2001). Surface runoff represents a total of 97.3 BCM/year, of which 5.4 BCM/year comes from drainage of the aquifers and thus needs to be subtracted from the total. Groundwater recharge is estimated at about 49.3 BCM/year, of which 12.7 BCM/year is obtained from infiltration in the river bed and also needs to be subtracted. Iran receives 6.7 BCM/year of surface water from Pakistan and some water from Afghanistan through the Helmand River. The flow of the Arax river, at the border with Azerbaijan, is estimated at 4.6 BCM/year. The surface runoff to the sea and to other countries is estimated at 55.9 BCM/year. Per capita, water availability in the pre-Islamic Revolution era was about 4,500 cubic meters. In 2009, this figure was less than 2,000 cubic meters.

Water usage

The total water withdrawal was estimated at about 70 BCM in 1993, rising to 93 BCM in 2004, of which 92% was used for agricultural purposes, 6% for domestic use and 2% for industrial use. Although this is equal to 51% of the actual available renewable water resources, annual abstraction from aquifers (57 BCM in 1993, 53 BCM in 2004) is already more than the estimated safe yield (46 BCM). Of the 4.3 BCM/year in 1993 (6.2 in 2004) used for domestic purposes, 61% is supplied from surface water and 39% from groundwater. For example, Greater Tehran with its population of more than 13 million is supplied by surface water from the Lar dam on the Lar River in the Northeast of the city, the Latyan dam on the Jajrood River in the North, the Karaj River in the Northwest, as well as by groundwater in the vicinity of the city. Provinces of Gilan, Mazandaran and Isfahan have the highest efficiency of irrigation with 54, 52 and 42 percents respectively, and Khuzestan province has the lowest irrigation efficiency with 38 percent. Tap water consumption in the country is 70% over and above the global average. 16 BCM of water was used for power generation in 1999.

As of 2014, Iran is using 70% of its total renewable freshwater, far above the upper limit of 40% recommended according to international norms.

Water pollution
Water pollution is caused by industrial and municipal wastewater, as well as by agriculture. Concerning municipal wastewater, the bulk of collected sewage is discharged untreated and constitutes a major source of groundwater pollution and a risk to public health. In a number of cities without sanitary sewerage, households discharge their sewage through open rainwater drains.

Infrastructure 
Most drinking water in Iran is supplied through modern infrastructure, such as dams, reservoirs, long-distance transmission pipelines—some of which are more than 300 km long—and deep wells. An estimated 60,000 traditional Karez  (کاریز) systems in the plateau regions of Iran in Yazd, Khorasan and Kerman—are still in use today for irrigation and drinking water supply in rural areas and small towns. The oldest and largest known Karez is in the Iranian city of Gonabad which after 2700 years still provides drinking and agricultural water to nearly 40,000 people.  Its main well depth is more than 360 meters and its length is 45 kilometers. It is estimated that there are as many as 500,000 deep and shallow wells in the country. There are 42 large dams under operation in Iran with a combined storage capacity of 33 BCM/year. These dams lose about 200 million cubic meters of storage capacity every year due to sedimentation (0.5–0.75% of their storage capacity). Most dams are multi-purpose dams for hydropower, irrigation, flood control and—in some cases—drinking water supply.

Political climate
In December 2013, Hamid Chitchian, head of the Ministry of Energy, which is in charge of regulating the water sector—stated that the sector's situation had reached "critical levels". He correctly established that past approaches, which mainly focused on constructing dams and trying to increase the storage capacity, would no longer be appropriate remedies. In fact, total storage capacity behind the country's many dams amounts to 68 billion cubic meters, whereas the water potential of the country's rivers totals 46 billion cubic meters per annum.

In July 2013, Issa Kalantari, the Minister of Agricultural under president Hashemi Rafsanjani, told Ghanoon newspaper that the water crisis is the "main problem that threatens" Iran, adding that it is more dangerous "than Israel, USA or political fighting among the Iranian elite". If the water issue is not addressed, Iran could become "uninhabitable". If this situation is not reformed, in 30 years Iran will be a ghost town. Even if there is precipitation in the desert, there will be no yield, because the area for groundwater will be dried and water will remain at ground level and evaporate."

A 2017 United Nations report stated that "Water shortages are acute; agricultural livelihoods no longer sufficient. With few other options, many people have left, choosing uncertain futures as migrants in search of work".

Protests 
Some analysts believe the water crisis may have been a significant contributor to the protests around January 2018. At least five protesters were allegedly shot in January 2018 in Qahderijan, where water rights were reportedly the main grievances. , small and intermittent water protests have continued to occur in some rural areas. In July 2021, people in Khuzestan Province took to the streets to protest water shortages.

See also 
 Environmental issues in Iran

References

Water scarcity
Environmental disasters in Asia
Water supply and sanitation in Iran
Articles containing video clips
Disasters in Iran
Environmental issues in Iran
Climate change in Iran